William H. Sorrell (born  March 9, 1947) is an American politician. He is the longest-serving attorney general in the history of the U.S. state of Vermont, holding the position for 20 years. Originally appointed by Governor Howard Dean in 1997, he was reelected nine times: in 1998, 2000, 2002, 2004, 2006, 2008, 2010, 2012, and 2014. During his last election, he defeated primary challenger TJ Donovan by a very narrow margin.  He did not run for re-election in 2016, and was succeeded by Donovan in January 2017.

Early life
A native of Burlington, Vermont, Sorrell is the son of Thomas W. Sorrell, who served as U.S. Marshal for Vermont, and Esther (Hartigan) Sorrell, a longtime Democratic Party activist and member of the Vermont Senate.  He received his Bachelor of Arts, magna cum laude, in 1970 from the University of Notre Dame, then earned his Juris Doctor from Cornell Law School in 1974.

Early career
Sorrell was Chittenden County Deputy State's Attorney in 1975–1977, then Chittenden County State's Attorney from 1977 to 1978. After working in private law practice at McNeil, Murray & Sorrell from 1978 to 1989, he returned to being State's Attorney from 1989 to 1992, then served as Vermont's Secretary of Administration from 1992 to 1997 until his appointment as Vermont Attorney General.

Attorney general

Tobacco litigation

Within weeks of taking office, Sorrell joined a suit against the nation's largest tobacco companies to end their deceitful behavior of lying about the harmful effects of their products.

The lawsuit resulted in a historic national settlement with Big Tobacco that to date has yielded over $300 million for Vermont taxpayers; and, as a result Big Tobacco will continue to pay Vermont approximately $25 million a year in perpetuity.

Sorrell also successfully stopped Big Tobacco's attempt to include cigarette advertising in national magazines sent to Vermont school children and scored a resounding victory against RJ Reynolds in a closely watched lawsuit attacking the marketing of the company's so-called "reduced risk" cigarettes.

Environmental protection

During Sorrell's tenure, Vermont became a national leader in anti-pollution efforts.

Sorrell joined litigation against American Electric Power, a major contributor to acid rain problems in Vermont and other states in the region. The settlement of the case is the largest settlement of an environmental pollution case in US history.

Sorrell successfully defended Vermont's strict auto-emission standards (the so-called "California Standard") against pushback from the national auto industry. The verdict was a success for the cause of reversing the adverse effects global warming and increasing the fuel economy of motor vehicles.

Other accomplishments
In June 2004, Sorrell began a one-year term as president of the National Association of Attorneys General (NAAG), and in June 2003 he was chosen by his fellow attorneys general to receive NAAG's Kelley–Wyman Award, given annually to the "Outstanding Attorney General."

Sorrell served a maximum term of six years as a member and then chair of the board of the American Legacy Foundation. In appreciation for his service, in 2008 the foundation endowed the William H. Sorrell Lecture Series, funding an annual address on tobacco control issues at a NAAG meeting.

He has served as a member of Vermont's Judicial Nominating Board, as president of United Cerebral Palsy of Vermont, secretary of the Vermont Coalition of the Handicapped and a member of the board of the Winooski Valley Park District.  He currently serves as chair of the board of the NAAG Mission Foundation.

Sorrell was recognized by the Coalition for a Tobacco Free Vermont as Tobacco Control Champion in 2003, and in 2009 as Citizen of the Year by the Vermont Medical Society and in 2010 by the National Humane Society with its Humane Law Enforcement Award.

Allegations of corruption
Sorrell has been accused of burying sensitive investigations and covering up criminal acts committed by persons or institutions with influence in Vermont. He is alleged to have covered up biological terrorism relating to the intentional infection of a series of patients at Northwestern Medical Center of St. Albans, VT. Sorrell has steadfastly maintained that his office investigated the apparent act of biological terrorism and found no evidence of wrongdoing. However, when his investigative files were subpoenaed, no evidence was found that any investigation ever took place. Sorrell's office claimed it had no records other than a few superficial interviews.

On January 27, 2016, Vermont independent newspaper Seven Days reported that Vermont State Police had "received a complaint of alleged criminal misconduct" from a panel of state's attorneys charged with investigating six allegations against Sorrell".

Vermont elections

References

External links
Office of the Attorney General – Attorney General William H. Sorrell official VT website
NAAG – Vermont Attorney General William H. Sorrell (D) profile
2006 2004 2002 2000 1998 campaign contributions
Project Vote Smart – William H. Sorrell (IL) profile
Bill Sorrell for Vermont Attorney General official campaign website

1947 births
21st-century American politicians
Cornell Law School alumni
Living people
Politicians from Burlington, Vermont
State cabinet secretaries of Vermont
University of Notre Dame alumni
Vermont articles needing attention
Vermont Attorneys General
Vermont Democrats
Vermont lawyers
State's attorneys in Vermont